The Orbiter Dobbertin (OD) is an amphibious vehicle designed and built by Rick Dobbertin in the early 1990s. The OD started out from a 1959 Heil milk tank trailer and was modified by Dobbertin over the course of 4 1/2 years.

On February 23, 1995, the OD became the first car to transit the Panama Canal.

References

External links
Official web site
Video of the DSO from Extra TV (first half, in English) and Good Morning Japan (second half, in Japanese).

Wheeled amphibious vehicles
Vehicles introduced in 1990